Lucius Afranius may refer to:

Lucius Afranius (consul)
Lucius Afranius (poet)